Simo is a surname which may refer to:

Alfredo Fernández Simó (1915–1991), Dominican novelist, poet and diplomat
Anna Simó (born 1968), Catalan politician
Ana María Simo (born 1943), New York playwright, essayist and novelist
Augustine Simo (born 1978), Cameroonian footballer
JD Simo (born 1985), American blues and rock musician
Isabel-Clara Simó (1943–2020), Valencian (Spanish) journalist and writer
Mariví Simó (born 1983), Spanish football defender
Lajos Simó (1943–2019), Hungarian former handball player
Sándor Simó (1934–2001), Hungarian film producer, director and screenwriter
Fidji Simo (born 1985), CEO of Instacart